Leucocnemis is a genus of moths of the family Noctuidae. The genus was erected by George Hampson in 1908.

Species
 Leucocnemis nivalis (J. B. Smith, 1894)
 Leucocnemis obscurella Barnes & McDunnough, 1916
 Leucocnemis perfundis (J. B. Smith, 1894)
 Leucocnemis variabilis Barnes & McDunnough, 1918

References

Cuculliinae